Robert Rochell (born April 26, 1998) is an American football cornerback for the Los Angeles Rams of the National Football League (NFL). He played college football at Central Arkansas before he was selected by the Rams in the fourth round of the 2021 NFL Draft.

Early life and high school
Rochell grew up in Shreveport, Louisiana and attended Fair Park Medical Careers Magnet High School, where he played football and ran track. He played multiple positions at Fair Park, including quarterback, running back, wide receiver, free safety, cornerback and outside linebacker.

College career
Rochell was a member of the Central Arkansas Bears for five seasons, redshirting his true freshman year. He became a full time starter as a redshirt sophomore. Rochell was named first-team All-Southland Conference after finishing his redshirt junior season with 44 tackles, 2.5 tackles for loss and a fumble recovery with five interceptions and 13 passes broken up. After the 2020 FCS season was moved to the spring due to the COVID-19 pandemic, Central Arkansas played an ad hoc schedule and Rochell started seven of the team's nine games. Rochell played in the 2021 Senior Bowl following the end of the fall season.

Professional career

Rochell was selected in the fourth round with the 130th overall pick of the 2021 NFL Draft by the Los Angeles Rams. On June 1, 2021, Rochell signed his four-year rookie contract with the Rams. He was placed on injured reserve on December 11. Without Rochell, the Rams won Super Bowl LVI against the Cincinnati Bengals.

References

External links
Central Arkansas Bears bio

Living people
Players of American football from Shreveport, Louisiana
American football cornerbacks
Central Arkansas Bears football players
Los Angeles Rams players
1998 births